Tointon is a surname. Notable people with the surname include:

 Hannah Tointon (born 1987), British actress
 Kara Tointon (born 1983), British actress